Rakesh Masih (born 18 March 1987) is an Indian football player who currently plays for Tollygunge Agragami in the Calcutta Football League.

Career
Masih spent four years at the Tata Football Academy and was regarded as one of the best cadets of his batch. While at the TFA, Masih earned a call up to the India Under-23 side in 2007 and played in the 2008 Olympic qualifiers. In 2008, he signed for the Kolkata giants Mohun Bagan and had a wonderful season.

The Punjab born player can play both as a central defender and in central midfield because of his strong build and good heading ability. Then-Mohun Bagan coach Karim Bencherifa used him in central midfield alongside the experienced Marcos Pereira and the two formed one of the best central midfield partnerships in the 2008–09 I-League campaign. Masih was instrumental in Bagan's record breaking ten match winning run in the league and the Federation Cup triumph that season.

In January 2009, Masih made his international debut in the 2-1 defeat against Hong Kong and since then he has been a regular member of the Indian squad. Masih's performances in the 2008–09 season won him nominations for the "Best Young Player" and "Best Player Of The Year (Fans' Choice)" categories in the inaugural edition of the FPAI Awards in 2009.

Last season, he was troubled with a number of injuries and thus could not feature regularly for Mohun Bagan in the I-League. He returned in the second half of the season but never regained his best form and Mohun Bagan struggled.

Mohammedan (loan)
Masih signed for Mohammedan on loan from Salgaocar F.C. and made his debut in the I-league on 20 October 2013 at the Bangalore Football Stadium against Bengaluru FC. He played the whole match, which Mohammedan lost 2-1.

References

External links
http://goal.com/en-india/people/india/21512/rakesh-masih
 https://web.archive.org/web/20110714111335/http://mohunbaganac.com/SEPT08/playerdetails.php?playerId=69
 http://mohunbaganac.com/SEPT08/news_details.php?newsid=296
 https://archive.today/20110925111555/http://mohunbaganac.com/SEPT08/news_details.php?newsid=943

Indian footballers
1987 births
Living people
2011 AFC Asian Cup players
I-League players
I-League 2nd Division players
Indian Super League players
India international footballers
Mohun Bagan AC players
Salgaocar FC players
Mohammedan SC (Kolkata) players
ATK (football club) players
Footballers from Punjab, India
Association football defenders
Tollygunge Agragami FC players